Hjalti Árnason (born 18 February 1963), nicknamed Hjalti Úrsus, is an Icelandic former strongman competitor and world champion powerlifter. Hjalti was known by the nickname "The Great Ursus". He first began in strength sports by competing as a junior powerlifter representing Iceland in 1983. Hjalti coached the great Jón Páll Sigmarsson and competed alongside Magnús Ver Magnússon in a team strength competition called Pure Strength in 1989 & 1990.

Biography
Hjalti Árnason was born in Reykjavík in 1963. He grew up in the same neighbourhood as Jón Páll Sigmarsson and they attended the same school, although Jón Páll was three years older. His sports career began with training in karate and he participated in many others such as soccer, handball, and track and field. He had a talent for powerlifting and shot to fame when he began competing internationally from 1983. In that year, he came first in the Junior European Championships and made the senior national team. Quickly though, he began to compete in strongman events to make a living as a semi-professional. He found at an early stage that powerlifting had little money or publicity associated with it and also his fellow Icelander and school friend, Jón Páll Sigmarsson, was beginning to make waves in the higher-profile world of the World's Strongest Man and its associated circuit. His forays into strength athletics consisted of a mixture of Highland Games and strongman events. It was noted that he relied on his "tremendous strength" but sacrificed technique and suffered from a lack of proper, regular coaching.

In 1985, Hjalti competed in the very first Iceland's Strongest Man contest. Hjalti Árnason was second to Jón Páll that year whilst Magnús Ver Magnússon came third. Hjalti would repeat podium finishes in this contest on more than one occasion whilst in the company of two men who between them won the World's Strongest Man title eight times. In one such contest, his "animalistic approach" was demonstrated when he broke his opponent's arm in an arm wrestling bout. Upon being asked to do "something spectacular for the TV cameras" by a sponsor, he was reported to have picked the sponsor up by an arm and a leg and hurled him some distance to the astonishment of bystanders.

On the world stage, he was a top performer in Highland Games. His wrestling match with Bill Kazmaier at Earlshall has been described as one of the best ever. He was highly rated at the World Muscle Power Championships and in breaking the world record in the platform lift became the first European to win the prestigious Le Defi Mark Ten International in Canada. However, his only appearance as a contestant at the World's Strongest Man was in 1996, but he failed to qualify for the finals. Prior to that, he had been to many events as a tester, alongside his great friend Mark Higgins. Prior to 1994, the WSM had a limited field with no heats. As such countries were rarely granted multiple competitor places. For Hjalti, when in the prime of his strength sporting career, this left him in the shadow of Jón Páll, and later the rise of Magnús Ver Magnússon. This has been described by David Webster as a pity because "he was undoubtedly one of the world's strongest men."

Hjalti continued to compete as a powerlifter and won the +125 kg super heavyweight class of the IPF World Powerlifting Championships in 1991 in Örebro, Sweden. Hjalti was later disqualified and the title passed to Hans Zerhoch. Hjalti was the first Icelander to break the 1000 kg barrier in the total (squat, bench press & deadlift).

Personal life and career after sport
From his marriage to Ethel Karlsdóttir, Hjalti has two sons, Greipur (born 1989) and Árni (born 1992). After divorcing, he moved in with his girlfriend, Halla Heimisdóttir. His careers were multiple and varied. He was a bouncer, caring supervisor in a psychiatric hospital, security agent and debt collector. He also became a system administrator for Post and Telecom in Iceland. He also remained close to sport and became a promoter of strength athletics in Iceland. His latest venture was the promotion of Iceland's Strongest Man. His brother is a noted musician in Iceland. Hjalti created the Jón Páll Sigmarsson Classic, which held its inaugural event in November 2010.

References

Icelandic strength athletes
Icelandic powerlifters
1963 births
Living people
Sportspeople from Reykjavík